Shell Mex House, also known as 80 Strand, is a grade II listed building located at number 80 Strand in London, England. The building was opened in 1932 on the site of the Hotel Cecil and stands behind the original façade of the hotel, between the Adelphi building and the Savoy Hotel. Broadly Art Deco in style, it was designed by Frances Milton Cashmore of the architectural firm of Messrs Joseph.

Description

The clock is flanked by four large, hieratic marble figures at the south corners sculpted by William Charles Holland King. The clock, which was known for a time as "Big Benzene", has the largest clock face in the UK, at 7.62 metres in diameter, just 0.02 metres more than the clocks on the Liver Building in Liverpool; it was supplied by Gillett & Johnston of Croydon. The building faces the river and the Strand. It was described by architectural historian Nikolaus Pevsner as "thoroughly unsubtle, but...hold[s] its own in London's river front."

History
The building was for many years the London headquarters of Shell-Mex & BP, for which it was originally built. Shell-Mex & BP was a joint venture company created by Shell and British Petroleum in 1932, when they decided to merge their United Kingdom marketing operations. Upon the UK marketing separation of Shell and BP in 1976, Shell Mex House became the head office of Shell UK, which was Shell's UK operating company. Changes in the way that Shell was run in the 1990s led to the disposal of the property by Shell. Today, simply known as 80 Strand, most of its floors are occupied by companies belonging to Pearson plc.

The entrance of the building, which is set back from the Strand, is through a large gated archway. A green plaque was affixed to the wall just inside the gate in March 2008, proclaiming: "The Royal Air Force was formed and had its first headquarters here in the former Hotel Cecil 1st April 1918". Below it is a brass plate stating: "This plaque was unveiled by the Chief of the Air Staff Air Chief Marshal Sir Glenn Torpy to mark the 90th anniversary of the formation of the Royal Air Force".

During World War II, the building became home to the Ministry of Supply, which co-ordinated the supply of equipment to the national armed forces.  It was also the home of the Petroleum Board, which handled the distribution of petroleum products during the war. It was badly damaged by a bomb in 1940.

The building reverted to Shell-Mex & BP on 1 July 1948, with a number of floors remaining occupied by the Ministry of Aviation (latterly the Board of Trade, Civil Aviation Division) until the mid-1970s. During this time, until the department's move to the present location in Farnborough, the building was also the headquarters for the Air Accidents Investigation Branch.

On 17 May 2006, The Times reported that the building was for sale and that the Indian-Kenyan Kandhari family was the front-runner in the battle to buy it from the existing owners, Vincent and Robert Tchenguiz. The Kandharis were said to have offered £530 million for the building, but they were competing with other interested groups, including Menorah, the Israeli insurer, an Irish company, and several British companies. An offer believed to be for £520 million ($1.02 billion) was made in December 2006 by Istithmar, the investment agency of the Dubai government, which withdrew its offer before completion. The property was subsequently sold in July 2007 to a fund managed by Westbrook Partners for £988 million.

See also
Adelphi, London
Shell Centre
List of largest clock faces

References

External links

Eighty Strand website

Art Deco architecture in London
Buildings and structures in the City of Westminster
Grade II listed buildings in the City of Westminster
Grade II listed office buildings
Office buildings completed in 1932
Shell plc
Strand, London
1932 establishments in England